misterb&b is a travel and social networking website that provides a searchable database of LGBT+ friendly rentable lodging, including rooms, apartments, hotels, and homestays, primarily catering to gay men. It is accessible via a website and a mobile app.

It is considered the largest gay-focused booking app in the world.

History and formation
misterb&b started as a combination of gay travel website myGayTrip and short-term apartment rental service, Sejourning.

Co-founder Matthieu Jost had used services like Airbnb with mixed results. Jost suggested that it was difficult to screen potential hosts to see if they might be gay-friendly. After several uncomfortable experiences, Jost looked into starting a gay-friendly alternative.

The misterb&b website was launched in the spring of 2014.

In 2014, the site was temporarily blocked by Gogo, an in-flight Wifi service.

By 2015, misterb&b had 55,000 hosts in over 130 countries.

The company was selected for and participated in 500 Startups, one of the largest early-stage accelerators in the world.

In May 2015, it was selected by The Next Web as one of the top notable startups from the accelerator. The company also raised $2 million in seed funding at that time.

In June 2017, the company raised a series A round of $8.5 million.

Joel Simkhai, the founder of Grindr, was an early investor.

As of February 2019, the site had over 200,000 properties in 135 countries with total funding of $13.5 million.

As of August 2019, it had over 300,000 hosts in over 135 countries.

Operation
The main function of the website is to match prospective LGBT travelers with LGBT-friendly hosts worldwide.

The website encourages its hosts to make their apartments or rooms available during major LGBT events in their city. It also acts as a social networking service, travel guide, and online community for gay travelers.

There is no charge for posting an apartment or room for rent on misterb&b, but the site charges 17% on room fare from the host and 17% of the final bill from the guest.

Users can search using a number of parameters in their desired city. Some of these parameters include: willingness to accept pets, the choice between gay or simply straight allies, and an option for seeking out "unusual" apartments or rooms.

misterb&b reported that 60% of its hosts in Paris do not use other sharing accommodation websites. It also provides curated hotels on the platform and tools to help members stay safe such as misterb&b gift cards.

There has been a misconception that the service promotes a hookup culture.

Misterbnb encourages forming friendships between hosts and guests.

It offers a loyalty program. It also has safety features such as identity verification.

Recognition
Matthieu Jost, the CEO has been ranked top 100 most inspirational and influential LGBTQ+ leader in the world by Out Magazine.

misterb&b was called "an Airbnb for gay men" by Forbes.

See also
 Homosocialization

References

External links
 

LGBT-related websites
French travel websites
Companies based in Delaware
Transport companies established in 2014
American companies established in 2014
Hospitality companies established in 2014
French companies established in 2014